Georgina Jolibois (born 1968) is a Canadian politician who was elected in the 2015 Canadian federal election to represent the riding of Desnethé—Missinippi—Churchill River during the 42nd Canadian Parliament. Jolibois sought re-election in the 2019 election but was defeated by her Conservative challenger Gary Vidal.

Prior to her election, Jolibois served for twelve years as mayor of La Loche, Saskatchewan. She also served ten years on the Royal Canadian Mounted Police "F" Division Aboriginal Advisory Committee.

Jolibois sponsored the private member's Bill C-369, which sought to make National Indigenous Peoples Day a legal holiday. While the bill was not adopted, a similar bill was adopted in the subsequent parliament, making September 30 a legal holiday called National Day for Truth and Reconciliation.

In late 2021, Jolibois was named the Saskatchewan New Democratic Party's candidate for the Athabasca by-election to replace Buckley Belanger, which occurred on February 15, 2022. In an upset, she was defeated by the Saskatchewan Party's candidate Jim Lemaigre.

Personal information 
Georgina Jolibois was born and raised in La Loche, Saskatchewan, near the Clearwater River Dene First Nation. She has a degree from the University of Saskatchewan. Before being elected into Parliament, Jolibois was the mayor of La Loche from 2003 to 2015, and she is also a member of the Saskatchewan Association of Northern Communities. In 2015, she was elected as the Desnethé—Missinippi—Churchill River area representative in Parliament.

2015 Canadian federal election 

In 2015, Jolibois expressed her desire to run as a candidate for the New Democratic Party in the upcoming 2015 Canadian Federal Elections for the Desnethe-Missinippi-Churchill River area. This riding covers half of Saskatchewan's northern area and includes many small communities as well as First Nation reserves and fly-in-posts.

Jolibois won her riding by only 71 votes over the Liberal candidate, Lawrence Joseph, and defeated incumbent Rob Clarke. After a recount, it was found that Jolibois won by 82 votes over Joseph, not the previously recorded results of 71 votes.

Electoral record

References

External links

1968 births
Living people
21st-century Canadian politicians
21st-century Canadian women politicians
21st-century First Nations people
Dene people
First Nations women in politics
Indigenous Members of the House of Commons of Canada
Mayors of places in Saskatchewan
Members of the House of Commons of Canada from Saskatchewan
New Democratic Party MPs
Women mayors of places in Saskatchewan
Women members of the House of Commons of Canada